Alerce is a Chilean town in the communes of Puerto Montt and Puerto Varas in Llanquihue Province, Los Lagos Region.

See also
 List of towns in Chile

External links 
 

Populated places in Llanquihue Province